Makalali Conservancy, also known as the Greater Makalali Private Game Reserve, is situated west of Phalaborwa, and north of Hoedspruit, in the Limpopo province, South Africa, and has an area of about 24,500 Ha. Makalali means ‘place of rest’ in the Shangaan language.

See also 
 Protected areas of South Africa

Protected areas of Limpopo
Nature conservation in South Africa